Hikaru Ono (born 30 August 1992) is a Japanese karateka. She won the silver medal in the women's individual kata event at the 2021 World Karate Championships held in Dubai, United Arab Emirates. A month later, she won the gold medal in this event at the 2021 Asian Karate Championships held in Almaty, Kazakhstan.

She won the silver medal in the women's kata event at the 2022 World Games held in Birmingham, United States.

Achievements

References 

Living people
1992 births
Place of birth missing (living people)
Japanese female karateka
Competitors at the 2022 World Games
World Games silver medalists
World Games medalists in karate
21st-century Japanese women